Dragon Swamp, also known as Dragon Run, is a  stream in the U.S. state of Virginia, flowing through King and Queen, Essex, Middlesex, and Gloucester counties. It is the main freshwater tributary of the Piankatank River.

See also
Dragon Run watershed

References

USGS Hydrologic Unit Map - State of Virginia (1974)

Landforms of Essex County, Virginia
Landforms of Gloucester County, Virginia
Landforms of King and Queen County, Virginia
Landforms of Middlesex County, Virginia
Swamps of Virginia